Optica may refer to:

Optica (society), a scientific organisation supporting optics research and education
Optica (journal), a scientific journal on optics
Edgley Optica, an aircraft
Lithops optica, a plant
Optica Optics Software, software for optical ray-tracing and engineering design
Optica, a 2013 album by Shout Out Louds